Stiga Group (formerly  GGP Spa) is a European manufacturer and distributor of lawnmowers and a wide range of motorized garden tools. It is headquartered in Castelfranco Veneto (Italy).  Stiga has 13 subsidiaries in Europe (Austria, Italy, Benelux, Czech Republic, Denmark, Finland, France, Germany, Norway, Poland, Sweden, UK). Stiga distributes and sells its products in over 70 countries around the world.

Stiga was originally a Swedish brand known for the production and distribution of lawnmowers, a wide range of motorized garden tools, snowmakers, and table tennis products and table hockey games. In the year 2000, Stiga was acquired by Castelgarden SpA via a merger with  Alpina Professional & Garden SpA, both located in Italy. The company's expansion in Europe continued with the acquisition of Mountfield. Together they formed Global Garden Products (GGP) Group then renamed Stiga Group in 2017.

Stiga Sports
The brand Stiga is today used by the Swedish company Stiga Sports for the production of sports products, including table tennis, snowriders and table hockey. Stiga started the production of table tennis products in 1938 and the production of hockey games in 1944. 
The production of table is now operated under the brand "Stiga Sport", and it has been manufacturing tennis products since 1944. It started the production of table hockey games in 1957 and it was a huge success. The company started the production of lawnmowers in 1958.

Bengt Bandstigen founded the table tennis company Banda in 1966, which later became Stiga Sports AB. In 1983, the company begun to sell Stiga table tennis products and year 2006 it acquired the Stiga Games division to the company.

Brand History
 6 March 1934, Stig Hjelmquist founded in Tranås the company Firma Fabriksprodukter, that will later become Stiga. 
1938 Production of the first articles that would make Stiga world-famous: the table tennis products. 
1938 The new company name Stigma, later on changed to Stiga, was founded. 
1943 Stiga started to produce equipment for table tennis under their own management. Mainly it was so called complete games with rackets, net, attachment system and ball.
1949 Sees a change of name from Stigma to Stiga.
1957 Production of the first table hockey game. 
1971 Stiga was established abroad and sales offices in London and Helsinki were opened.
1976 (4 June) his majesty Carl XVI Gustav inaugurated Stiga's new factory of 18 000 m2, and with its total of 34,000m2  it becomes the biggest factory in the Nordic countries, concerning manufacturing of motor driven lawn mowers.
1981 The company is reorganized to better reflect Stiga's operations, creating three divisions: Sports, Gun and Garden.
1994 Stiga celebrates its 60th anniversary. 
1997 Stiga has representation in around 40 countries, including New Zealand, North America, South America and Eastern Europe.

References

 
 Stiga Games - Games division
Stiga Group - Stiga Group
 Table Tennis Stiga - Table Tennis Stiga

External links
 
 Stiga Games - Games division
 Table Tennis Stiga - Table Tennis Stiga

Sportswear brands
Manufacturing companies of Sweden
Sporting goods manufacturers of Sweden
Tool manufacturing companies of Sweden
Swedish brands
Tool manufacturing companies of Italy